Wagin was an electoral district of the Legislative Assembly of Western Australia. It was in existence from 1911 to 1950 and from 1989 to 2017. The seat was named after the town of Wagin and incorporated portions of the Wheatbelt, albeit with varying boundaries. Wagin was a safe seat for the National Party for most of its existence.

History
Wagin was first created for the 1911 state election. Until 1947, its member was Sydney Stubbs who represented several different conservative parties over that time. Stubbs was succeeded by Crawford Nalder, who would later become Country Party leader. Wagin was abolished ahead of the 1950 state election whence Nalder instead became the member for Katanning.

Wagin was recreated at the 1989 state election. The first member of the recreated seat was National MP Bob Wiese, formerly the member for Narrogin; the district that Wagin largely replaced. Wiese was succeeded by current member and National MP Terry Waldron at the 2001 state election. Waldron held the seat until Wagin was abolished in a redistribution prior to the 2017 state election. Its territory was incorporated in the seats of Albany, Central Wheatbelt, Roe and Warren-Blackwood.

In its last incarnation, Wagin was a large rural electorate in the southern part of the Wheatbelt region. Its major population centres included Cuballing, Boddington, Brookton, Corrigin, Gnowangerup, Hyden, Lake Grace, Katanning, Kojonup, Narrogin and Wagin.

Members for Wagin

Election results

References

External links
 ABC election profiles: 2005 2008
 WAEC district maps: 1996–2005 2005–2008 2008–

Wagin
Wheatbelt (Western Australia)
1911 establishments in Australia
Constituencies established in 1911
2017 disestablishments in Australia
Constituencies disestablished in 2017